Žabjek v Podbočju is a village on the right bank of the Krka River southwest of Podbočje in the Municipality of Krško in eastern Slovenia. The area is part of the traditional region of Lower Carniola. It is now included in the Lower Sava Statistical Region.

Name
The name of the settlement was changed from Žabjek to Žabjek v Podbočju in 1955.

Cultural heritage
A small chapel-shrine at the village spring was built in the mid-19th century.

References

External links
Žabjek v Podbočju on Geopedia

Populated places in the Municipality of Krško